The 2023 National Invitational Tournament is a single-elimination tournament of 32 NCAA Division I men's college basketball teams not selected to participate in the 2023 NCAA Tournament.  The tournament began on March 14 and will end on March 30. The first three rounds will be played on campuses, with the semifinal and championship final played at Orleans Arena in the Las Vegas Valley.

Participants
Teams and parings for the 2023 NIT were released by the NIT Committee on Sunday, March 12.  Thirty-two teams qualifed for the NIT, both automatic qualifiers and at-large selections.  In 2022, the Xavier Musketeers won the NIT Title.

Automatic qualifiers
Teams which had the best regular season record in their conference but failed to win their conference tournament automatically qualify to be selected to the NIT. Some of these teams may still receive an at-large berth into the NCAA Tournament.

At-large bids
The following teams were awarded at-large bids.

Declined invitations 
The following programs declined to participate in the 2023 NIT:

 Dayton
 North Carolina

Bracket
The 32-team bracket was announced on March 12, via the NIT Selection Show on ESPNU at 10 p.m. EST.

^   Oklahoma State played its first round game at Youngstown State due to a scheduling conflict with Gallagher-Iba Arena.
^^  Sam Houston State played its first round game at Santa Clara due to a scheduling conflict with Bernard Johnson Coliseum.

^  Cincinnati played its second round game at Hofstra due to their home court at Fifth Third Arena being renovated.
^^  Cincinnati played its third round game at Utah Valley due to their home court at Fifth Third Arena being renovated.

* Denotes overtime period

Media
ESPN, Inc. has exclusive television rights to all of the NIT games. It will telecast every game across ESPN, ESPN2, ESPNU, ESPN3, and ESPN+. Westwood One has exclusive radio rights to the semifinals and the championship.

See also
 2023 Women's National Invitation Tournament
 2023 NCAA Division I men's basketball tournament
 2023 College Basketball Invitational

References

National Invitation Tournament
College basketball tournaments in Nevada
Basketball competitions in the Las Vegas Valley
National Invitation
National Invitation Tournament
2020s in Nevada
National Invitation Tournament